Buffalo Bill is a lost 1894 black-and-white silent film from Edison Studios, produced by William K. L. Dickson with William Heise as cinematographer. Filmed on a single reel, using standard 35 mm gauge, it has a 60-second runtime. The film was shot in Edison's Black Maria studio and is an exhibition of rifle shooting by Buffalo Bill (William F. Cody) himself. The film is one of several shot by Dickson and Heise after Thomas Edison invited Cody and his Wild West show performers to the kinetoscope studio.

See also
 List of Western films before 1920

References

External links 
 

1894 films
1894 Western (genre) films
1894 short films
American black-and-white films
American short documentary films
American silent short films
Black-and-white documentary films
Films directed by William Kennedy Dickson
Films shot in New Jersey
Lost American films
Lost Western (genre) films
Silent American Western (genre) films
1890s American films